Charles Stanier (17 April 1886 – 9 January 1956) was a British sculptor. His work was part of the sculpture event in the art competition at the 1948 Summer Olympics.

References

1886 births
1956 deaths
20th-century British sculptors
20th-century British male artists
British male sculptors
Olympic competitors in art competitions
People from Dudley